Carmel Valley is an unincorporated community in Monterey County, California, United States. The term "Carmel Valley" generally refers to the Carmel River watershed east of California State Route 1, and not specifically to the smaller Carmel Valley Village. At the time of the 2020 census the CCD population was 6,189. In November 2009, a majority of residents voted against incorporation.

History
The earliest archaeological findings show that Carmel Valley had two separate tribes, the Esselens that lived in Upper Carmel Valley and the Rumsens lived from Mid-Carmel Valley to the mouth of Carmel Valley.

The Rancho Los Laureles, a  Mexican land grant in present-day Monterey County, California, was given in 1839 by Governor Juan Alvarado to José Manuel Boronda and Vicente Blas Martínez. The grant extended along the Carmel River in Carmel Valley; and encompassed present day Carmel Valley. In 1882, the Pacific Improvement Company (PIC) purchased the Rancho Los Laureles. In 1916, Samuel F.B. Morse became the manager of the PIC and his job was to liquidate the PIC holdings.

James Meadows (1817-1902) was an English-born immigrant that came to Monterey in 1838. In 1842, Meadows and Loreta purchased the  Palo Escrito Mexican land grant from Monterey businessman Thomas O. Larkin who had acquired several land grants in California. He donated land and helped found the Carmelo School, which was the earliest school in Carmel Valley. The James Meadows Tract was between the Rancho Cañada de la Segunda to the west, Rancho Los Laureles to the northeast, and Garland Ranch Regional Park to the south. His daughter, Isabel Meadows, was an Ohlone ethnologist and the last fluent speaker of the Rumsen Ohlone language.

William Hatton (1849–1894), born in Ireland and married to Kate Harney (1851-1922), came to California in 1870. In 1888, Hatton became the manager of Rancho Cañada de la Segunda, which extended along the north bank of the Carmel River into the mouth of Carmel Valley. The land was owned by Dominga Doni de Atherton, the widowed wife of Faxon Atherton (namesake of Atherton, California). By 1892, Hatton purchased the Rancho from Dominga. Hatton operated a dairy business, which was located at Highway 1 and Carmel Valley Road, at the site of the present-day The Barnyard Shopping Village. 

The Berwick Manor and Orchard was located on Boronda Road off Carmel Valley Road in Carmel Valley. The farmstead was acquired in 1869 by Edward Berwick, a writer and educator as well as a scientific farmer. The manor and orchard was listed on the National Register of Historic Places on November 17, 1977. The Berwick Manor and Orchard was sold in 1961 and later subdivided into what is known today as the Berwick Manor Subdivision.

In 1919, Morse formed the Del Monte Properties and acquired PIC. In 1923, the Del Monte Properties divided the land into 11 parcels. Marion Hollins bought . In 1926, developer Frank B. Porter bought . He later acquired a portion of the Hollins ranch and sold it to Byington Ford. Byington and his wife Marion used  as a summer ranch and named it Moon Trail Ranch. It was located at Via Las Encinas in Carmel Valley.

The Holman Ranch, originally part of the Rancho Los Laureles, passed through many hands until 1928, when San Francisco businessman, Gordon Armsby, purchased  in Carmel Valley. He built a Spanish-style hacienda out of Carmel stone with terracotta roofing, and oak-beamed ceilings. It became a Hollywood retreat for Charlie Chaplin, Theda Bara, Marlon Brando, and Clark Gable. Today, the Holman Ranch is a privately owned winery, with a tasting room and offers a venue for weddings and special events.

Geography and ecology
Within the CCD, the Carmel Valley Village lies on the eastern bank of the Carmel River while the community of Robles del Rio is located on the western bank. Carmel Valley Road (County Route G16) is the main route through the valley, connecting to California State Route 1 near the City of Carmel to the west.

The Carmel River drains the area of Carmel Valley. Primary ecosystems of the vicinity include California oak woodland, riparian woodland, chaparral, grassland and savanna. Dominant oak trees include Quercus agrifolia. The locale of Carmel Valley is also the northernmost range of the hybrid oak Quercus x alvordiana.

The Garland Ranch Regional Park is located at 700 West Carmel Valley Road. The Monterey Peninsula Regional Park District (MPRPD) manages the Garland Ranch Regional Park.

Climate
This region experiences warm dry summers, with no average monthly temperatures above . With heat waves in the upper 70s to 101 degrees F. The further inland you go. According to the Köppen Climate Classification system, Carmel Valley has a warm-summer Mediterranean climate, abbreviated "Csb" on climate maps.

Demographics

2020
At the 2020 census Carmel Valley had a population of 6,189. The racial makeup of Carmel Valley was 5,502 White, 32 African American, 57 Native American, 126 Asian, 17 Pacific Islander, 270 from other races, and 685 from two or more races. Hispanic or Latino of any race were 624.

The age distribution was 1.7% under the age of 5; 16.0% under the age of 18, 84.0% 18 years and over; and 37.5% 65 or older. The median age was 58.8 years.

Government
At the county level, Carmel Valley is represented on the Monterey County Board of Supervisors by Mary L. Adams, as the 5th District Supervisor.

Tourism
Carmel Valley has a number of wine tasting rooms, as well as several high-end hotels affiliated with the wineries. Wineries with tasting rooms in Carmel Valley include Holman Ranch, Bernardus, Boëté, Chateau Sinnet, Folktale, Galante, Georis, Heller Estate, Joullian Village, Joyce Vineyards, Parsonage, San Saba and Talbott. A public bus, called the Grapevine Express Route 24 and run by Monterey-Salinas Transit, stops at most of these tasting rooms.

The Monterey Wine Trolley also offers a tour on a former San Francisco trolley that makes stops at several wineries in the Monterey Peninsula and Carmel Valley.

Notable sites 

The Jamesburg Earth Station, one of the world's largest tracking satellite dish antennas, is located in Carmel Valley. This telecommunication facility was used by NASA during its Apollo Moon landings. Currently it is being used by Lone Signal a crowdfunded active SETI project designed to send messages from Earth to an extraterrestrial civilization.
Treasure was hidden somewhere in Carmel Valley by Sheriff William Roach's brother-in-law, Jerry MacMahon. MacMahon was killed in a barroom brawl before he could reveal the location of the money. Preceding the incident, Maria Encarnacion Ortega de Sanchez, the widow of a wealthy rancher, was being cheated by local authorities, including the Sheriff, William Roach, who took her fortune under the guise of guardianship. After kidnapping Roach with the help of a local gunslinger named Anastacio Garcia, they held Roach in a jail cell in Stockton until he agreed to release the widow's gold. But Roach had bribed a guard to ride to Monterey and urge Roach's family to hide the gold. Chief Justice of California David S. Terry had been interested in the 'Widow Sanchez' case.
Stonepine Estate, a resort used to shoot the wedding of Eden Capwell and Cruz Castillo for the Santa Barbara TV series in 1988.
Carmel Valley Road-Boronda Road Eucalyptus Tree Row is located on Boronda Road off Carmel Valley Road in Carmel Valley. The unusual street side row of Eucalyptus globulus trees was planted sometime between 1874 and 1881, by Nathan Weston Spaulding, during the species' peak popularity in California for Landscaping. The landscape feature was listed on the National Register of Historic Places on January 10, 2008.

Notable people 
 Wah Chang, American designer, sculptor, and artist
 Doris Day, American actress, singer, and animal welfare activist
 Scott Fujita, retired NFL football player for New Orleans Saints
 Julian P. Graham, photographer of the Monterey Peninsula
 Ingemar Henry Lundquist, inventor and mechanical engineer
 Michael Nesmith, musician, songwriter and filmmaker, former member of The Monkees
 Leon Panetta, former United States Secretary of Defense, former Director of the Central Intelligence Agency (2009–11), former Congressman (1977–93) and White House Chief of Staff (1994–97)
 Maurice White, founder of R&B/Soul group Earth, Wind & Fire
 Alexander Weygers, a polymath Dutch-American artist who patented the design of the discopter (the "flying saucer") in 1944

See also
 List of places in California

References

External links
 CARMEL VALLEY
 

Census county divisions
Santa Lucia Range
Unincorporated communities in Monterey County, California
Unincorporated communities in California